The 1964 European Junior Games was the first edition of what would become the biennial athletics competition for European athletes aged under twenty. It was an unofficial competition without sanction from the European Athletic Association. The event was held at the 10th-Anniversary Stadium in Warsaw, Poland, between 18 and 20 September. The success of the competition eventually led to the creation of the official European Athletics Junior Championships in 1970.

Medal summary

Men

Women

Medal table

References

European Junior Championships 1964 Results. World Junior Athletics History . retrieved on 2013-10-06.

European Athletics U20 Championships
European Junior Games 1964
European Junior Games 1964
Junior Games
European Junior Games
European Junior
European Junior Games
European Junior Games